Larchmont station is a commuter rail stop on the Metro-North Railroad's New Haven Line, located in Larchmont, New York.

History
Larchmont station was originally built by the New York and New Haven Railroad and was rebuilt by the New York, New Haven and Hartford Railroad twice during the 20th century: first in the 1920s in order to facilitate a separate New York, Westchester and Boston Railway station, and again in the mid-1950s for construction of the New England Thruway.

Station layout
The station has two high-level side platforms each 10 cars long.

West of the station, a small NYNH&H yard used to exist close to the New Rochelle-Larchmont border. As of August 2006, weekday commuter ridership was 3,648, and there are 1,015 parking spots.

References

External links

 Station from New England Thruway from Google Maps Street View

Larchmont, New York
Metro-North Railroad stations in New York (state)
Stations on the Northeast Corridor
Stations along New York, New Haven and Hartford Railroad lines
Railway stations in Westchester County, New York